Henry Richard Hoare (1784–1836) was an English amateur cricketer.

Life

He was the only son of Sir Richard Colt Hoare, 2nd Baronet and his wife Hester Lyttelton (1762–1785), daughter of William Henry Lyttelton, born 17 September 1784. He matriculated at Christ Church, Oxford in 1803.

An unambitious pleasure-seeker, Hoare married in 1808. In 1811 he suffered a breakdown, and his father took against his wife Charlotte, leading to a family rupture. He separated from Charlotte, and was heavily in debt.

Hoare was a member of Marylebone Cricket Club (MCC) and made known appearances in three high-level matches from 1823 to 1824. He died 18 September 1836 at Hastings, Sussex.

Family
Hoare married on 20 February 1808 Charlotte Dering, daughter of Sir Edward Dering, 7th Baronet. They had a daughter Ann(e) (1808–1872), who married in 1835 Sir George Benvenuto Buckley Mathew.

References

External links

Bibliography
 Arthur Haygarth, Scores & Biographies, Volume 1 (1744–1826), Lillywhite, 1862

1784 births
1836 deaths
English cricketers
English cricketers of 1787 to 1825
Marylebone Cricket Club cricketers
Hoare family